Grand Kru-1 is an electoral district for the elections to the House of Representatives of Liberia. The constituency covers Bleebo District, the Trehn District, the Garraway District, the Grand Cess Wedabo District and the Kpor community of the Barclayville-Picnicess District.

Elected representatives

References

Electoral districts in Liberia